Todos los días sale el sol (English: The sun rises every day) is the debut studio album by Spanish alternative rock band Bongo Botrako. It was produced by Mario Patiño and lead vocalist Uri Giné, and was released in Spain on September 27, 2010, on Kasba Music. The album features the most notable hit of the band, "Todos los días sale el sol" (also known as "Chipirón"), which peaked at No. 12 on the Spain Songs chart. Todos los días sale el sol was later also released in France, Germany, United Kingdom, Belgium, Netherlands, Luxembourg and Japan.

Track listing

Personnel

Credits adapted from the liner notes of Todos los días sale el sol.

Bongo Botrako
 Uri Giné – vocals, production
 Nacho Pascual – guitar
 Xavi Vallverdú – keyboard
 David Garcia – bass
 Gorka Robert – drums, percussion
 Xavi Barrero – trumpet
 Oscar Gómez – sax

Additional musicians
 Rubén Sierra – vocals (track 1)
 Adrià Salas – vocals (track 1)
 José Capel – vocals (track 4)
 Leo Fernández – vocals (track 8)
 Meri López – vocals (track 11)
 El Bravo – guitar (track 11)
 Romain Renard – accordion (tracks 6, 7)
 Sergi López – percussion (tracks 6, 11)

Production
 Mario Patiño – production, engineering, mixing
 Edgar Beltri – additional engineering
 Yves Roussel – mastering

Design
 Cristina Pastrana – design

References

2010 debut albums
Bongo Botrako albums